National Hospital Organization Nagara Medical Center (国立病院機構長良医療センター) is a hospital located in Gifu, Japan, which is administered by the National Hospital Organization of Japan. This hospital was established in March 2005, from the merger of two hospitals, National Hospital Organization Gifu Hospital and National Hospital Organization Nagara Hospital.There are 500-800 employees working at the hospital.

Overview 
National Hospital Organization Nagara Medical Center has 468 beds. 120 of them are for the severely multiple handicapped children, 80 for the patients of muscular dystrophy, and 52 for the patients of tuberculosis. Nagara Medical Center has three major missions: Child health and development medicine (obstetrics, prenatal care, pediatrics), disability medicine (severe cases of multiple handicap, and muscular dystrophy), and cardiovascular and respiratory medicine (ICU).

History 
National Hospital Organization Nagara Hospital was established in 1927.  The National Hospital Organization Gifu Hospital was established in 1939.

Services 
 Cardiology
 Neurology
 Obstetrics—prenatal care
 Pediatrics—GCU (Growing Care Unit), NICU, pediatric neurology, 
pediatric surgery
 Physiatry—Physical therapy, Neuropsychological and Psychiatric rehabilitation
 Plastic surgery
 Pulmonology—respiratory care
 Radiology

Other services and departments
 Clinical laboratory
 Clinical research
 Clinical Pharmacology
 Educational support
 Medical support complying to the "Act for General Support for Persons with Disabilities"
 Nutrition support
 Pharmacy

References

External links 
National Hospital Organization Nagara Medical Center

Hospital buildings completed in 1927
Hospital buildings completed in 1939
Hospitals in Tokyo